James B. "Chippy" McGarr (May 10, 1863 – June 6, 1904) was an American professional baseball third baseman who played in Major League Baseball from 1884 to 1896. He played for the Chicago Browns/Pittsburgh Stogies, Philadelphia Athletics, St. Louis Browns, Kansas City Cowboys, Baltimore Orioles, Boston Beaneaters, and Cleveland Spiders.

See also
List of Major League Baseball players to hit for the cycle

References

External links

, or Retrosheet

1863 births
1904 deaths
19th-century baseball players
Major League Baseball third basemen
Chicago Browns/Pittsburgh Stogies players
Philadelphia Athletics (AA) players
St. Louis Browns (AA) players
Kansas City Cowboys players
Baltimore Orioles (AA) players
Boston Beaneaters players
Cleveland Spiders players
Worcester (minor league baseball) players
Haverhill (minor league baseball) players
Omaha Omahogs players
Omaha Lambs players
St. Joseph Clay Eaters players
Denver Mountaineers players
Milwaukee Brewers (minor league) players
Elmira Gladiators players
Rochester Flour Cities players
Providence Grays (minor league) players
Savannah Electrics players
Savannah Rabbits players
Columbus Senators players
New Haven Blues players
Holy Cross Crusaders baseball coaches
Baseball players from Worcester, Massachusetts